The 1998 USC Trojans football team represented the University of Southern California (USC) in the 1998 NCAA Division I-A football season. In their first year under head coach Paul Hackett, the Trojans compiled an 8-5 record (5–3 against conference opponents), finished in a tie for third place in the Pacific-10 Conference (Pac-10), and outscored their opponents by a combined total of 346 to 241.

This was Hackett's only winning season and bowl appearance with the team. It was also the Trojans' 75th anniversary playing at the Coliseum.

After three wins, including an opener against Purdue in the Pigskin Classic, USC was ranked as high as 18 in the AP Poll, but lost two of its next three and dropped out of the rankings permanently.

During halftime of the game against UCLA, 91-year-old USC "Super Fan" Giles Pellerin died while watching his 797th consecutive USC football game.

Quarterback Carson Palmer led the team in passing, completing 130 of 235 passes for 1,755 yards with seven touchdowns and six interceptions.  Chad Morton led the team in rushing with 199 carries for 985 yards and six touchdowns. R. Jay Soward led the team in receiving yards with 44 catches for 679 yards and six touchdowns; Billy Miller also had 49 catches for 623 yards and six touchdowns.

Schedule

Coaching staff

Season summary

Purdue

San Diego State

Oregon State

at Florida State

Arizona State

California

at Washington State

at Oregon

Washington

at Stanford

at UCLA

Notre Dame

Sun Bowl (vs TCU)

Awards
All-Pac-10: OL Travis Claridge, DL Ennis Davis, LB Chris Claiborne, DB Daylon McCutcheon, DB Rashard Cook

References

USC
USC Trojans football seasons
USC Trojans football